South of the Clouds is a 2018 novel by John D. Kuhns

Plot summary
The Great Recession of 2008 humbled many good men. Once
featured on the front pages of New York's business and society
papers, Jack Davis had spiraled downward in the aftermath of the crisis.

How far will someone go to get their reputation back? Jack is about to find out.
Exiled to the last remnant of his investment empire—a rusty silicon smelter
in the Chinese jungle north of the Burmese border—his comeback seems farfetched.
But it's either take his best shot or crawl away from the world in shame.

His prospects appear grim when Jack discovers his employees are using the
company's trucks to run jade from Burma over the border to China. His first
instinct is to clean house—until he learns they're making more money running
jade than he is smelting silicon.

Set in a dangerous, once-obscure corner of the world that has recently vaulted
to prominence, South of the Clouds tells the story of an American forced to
choose, not between right and wrong --"there's no legal here"—but between
the predictable and the unknown, between a stale life or one with Mei.

Wall Street isn't only about greed and cynicism. There are heroes there too.

Commentary for South of the Clouds
"An engaging novel with a protagonist who remains appealing, even as he tiptoes into shady territory,"—Kirkus Review.

Background information
South of The Clouds was published in the United States by Post Hill Press for release on July 17, 2018.

John D. Kuhns is an author, artist, businessman and investment banker, known for renewable and alternative energy investments around the world.

References

2018 American novels